Mulena Yomuhulu Mbumu wa Litunga Yubya I was a High Chief or King of Barotseland in Zambia, Africa, one of the sacred Lozi chiefs.

Biography

Family and marriage
He was a son of Prince Mbanga and Princess Notulu III and grandson of the Chief Ngombala.

Yubya was a regent for his grandfather, during his old age. He succeeded on his death. 

His wife was Namoyowa ta lole and his son was prince Kusiyo, 5th Chief of Nalolo, who opposed the succession of his cousin Mulambwa Santulu.

Death
He died at Namayula and was buried there.

References

Litungas